Paul Victor Gadola (July 21, 1929 – December 26, 2014) was a United States district judge of the United States District Court for the Eastern District of Michigan.

Education and career
Gadola was born in Flint, Michigan. He attended University of Michigan from September 1947 to June 1948. He attended Flint Junior College in Flint Michigan from June 1948 to August 1949 and received an Associate of Arts. He received an Artium Baccalaureus from Michigan State University in 1951 and a Juris Doctor from the University of Michigan Law School in 1953.

He was in the United States Army from November 1953 to September 1955 and was a private first class in the finance corps. He was in private practice in Flint from 1955 to 1988.

Federal judicial service

On April 23, 1987, Gadola was nominated by President Ronald Reagan to a seat on the United States District Court for the Eastern District of Michigan vacated by Judge John Feikens. Gadola was confirmed by the United States Senate on October 14, 1988, and received his commission on October 17, 1988. He assumed senior status on January 31, 2001 and stopped hearing cases in September 2008. He was succeeded by Judge Thomas Lamson Ludington.

Death

Gadola died on December 26, 2014, at Burcham Hills Retirement Community in East Lansing, Michigan.

References

Sources
 

1929 births
2014 deaths
People from Flint, Michigan
Michigan State University alumni
University of Michigan Law School alumni
Judges of the United States District Court for the Eastern District of Michigan
United States district court judges appointed by Ronald Reagan
20th-century American judges
United States Army soldiers
Mackinac Center for Public Policy